When It Happens to You: A Novel in Stories is a young adult novel written by American actress Molly Ringwald.

Summary 
The novel is centered on a couple named Phillip and Greta, whose marriage is in trouble.

References 

2012 American novels
American young adult novels